Break of Dawn is the final album by Rob Base and DJ E-Z Rock. It was released in 1994 via Rob Base's label, Funky Base Records. It was produced by DJ E-Z Rock, Rob Base, Al Dellentash, Dave Kowolski, Kyle Robinson and Jeff Dovner. Break of Dawn was met with lackluster sales; also, the album did not chart and its only single, "Break of Dawn", did not chart either.

Critical reception
The Cincinnati Post called the album "a pleasant surprise" and "slammin' big fun with stellar grooves."

Track listing
"Interlude"- :26  
"Break of Dawn"- 3:42  
"Interlude"- :30  
"Run Things"- 2:43  
"Let the Funk Flow"- 3:17  
"Symphony"- 3:20  
"Interlude"- 1:50  
"Are You With Me?"- 4:29  
"Bike Tights"- 2:45  
"Interlude"- :26  
"Make It Hot"- 3:03  
"Chillin'"- 3:50  
"I'm Comin'... I'm Comin'... I Came"- 3:21  
"Interlude"- :17  
"Get Your Hands Up"- 3:20

References

1994 albums
Rob Base & DJ E-Z Rock albums